Manuel Ramírez (born 7 December 1957) is a Colombian sprinter. He competed in the men's 200 metres at the 1984 Summer Olympics.

References

1957 births
Living people
Athletes (track and field) at the 1984 Summer Olympics
Colombian male sprinters
Olympic athletes of Colombia
Place of birth missing (living people)
South American Games gold medalists for Colombia
South American Games medalists in athletics
Competitors at the 1982 Southern Cross Games
20th-century Colombian people